The name turkey trot can refer to:

Turkey trot (dance), an early 20th-century dance step
"Let's Turkey Trot", a 1963 song by Little Eva
Turkey Trot, a Thanksgiving footrace